The 2010 Poznań Porsche Open was a professional tennis tournament played on clay courts. It was the seventh edition of the tournament which was part of the 2010 ATP Challenger Tour and the Tretorn SERIE+ tour. It took place at the Park Tenisowy Olimpia in Poznań, Poland from 17 to 25 July 2010, including the qualifying competition in the first two days.

Singles main draw entrants

Seeds

Other entrants
The following players received wildcards into the singles main draw:
  Marcin Gawron
  Andriej Kapaś
  Grzegorz Panfil
  Maciej Smoła

The following players received entry from the qualifying draw:
  André Ghem
  Javier Martí
  Dawid Olejniczak
  Roman Vögeli

Withdrawals
Before the tournament
  Andre Begemann
  Marsel İlhan
  Henri Kontinen
  Nicolás Massú

Doubles main draw entrants

Seeds

Other entrants
The following pairs received wildcards into the doubles main draw:
  Marcin Gawron /  Andriej Kapaś
  André Ghem /  Javier Martí
  Grzegorz Panfil /  Maciej Smoła

Champions

Singles

 Denis Gremelmayr def.  Andrey Kuznetsov, 6–1, 6–2

Doubles

 Rui Machado /  Daniel Muñoz de la Nava def.  James Cerretani /  Adil Shamasdin, 6–2, 6–3

References

External links
 Official Site

Poznań Porsche Open
Poznań Open
Poz